Thomas Treacy (2 March 1904 – September 1985) was an Irish hurler who played as a midfielder for the Tipperary and Dublin senior teams.

Treacy made his first appearance on the inter-county scene during the 1927 championship and was a regular member of the Tipperary and Dublin teams at various times until the end of the 1943 championship. During that time he won two All-Ireland medals, three Munster medals, Leinster medal and one National League medal.

At club level, Treacy had a lengthy career with the Killea and Young Irelands clubs.

References

1904 births
1985 deaths
Killea hurlers
Young Irelands (Dublin) hurlers
Dublin inter-county hurlers
Tipperary inter-county hurlers
Munster inter-provincial hurlers
All-Ireland Senior Hurling Championship winners